Séadna Morey (born 9 March 1991) is an Irish hurler who plays as a left corner-back for the Clare senior team.

Born in Sixmilebridge, County Clare, Morey first played competitive hurling whilst at school in St. Flannan's College. He arrived on the inter-county scene at the age of seventeen when he first linked up with the Clare minor team, before later lining out with the under-21 side. He made his senior debut in the 2012 championship and immediately became a regular member of the starting fifteen. A two-time Munster medalist in the minor grade and a three-time All-Ireland medalist in the under-21 grade, in 2013 he won a first All Ireland senior title.

At club level Morey plays with Sixmilebridge.

Morey attended NUI Galway and UL.

Morey withdrew from the Clare hurling squad ahead of the 2021 season.

Honours
Clare
 All-Ireland Senior Hurling Championship (1) : 2013
 All-Ireland Under-21 Hurling Championship (3) : 2012, 2013, 2014
 Munster Under-21 Hurling Championship (2) : 2012, 2013, 2014
 Munster Minor Hurling Championship (2) : 2010, 2011

Sixmilebridge
 Clare Senior Hurling Championship (4) : 2013  2015 2017 2019	
 Clare Under-21 Hurling Championship (1) : 2013

References

1993 births
Living people
Alumni of the University of Galway
Clare inter-county hurlers
Sixmilebridge hurlers